Richard Low (born 19 June 1952), also known as Liu Qianyi, is a Singaporean actor. He is best known for acting in many Chinese-language television dramas produced by MediaCorp Channel 8 and its predecessors. He also acted in some of Jack Neo's films.

Career
Low was a theatre actor before joining the SBC's drama training class in the 1980s and switching to television. He used to be typecast as villains or unruly gangster-like characters. He also acted as a “Siao” RSM In Zombiepura.

Filmography

Films
I Not Stupid 小孩不笨 (2002)
Homerun 跑吧！孩子 (2003)
The Best Bet 突然发财 (2004)
Avatar 流放化身 (2005)
The 5Cs 一本难念的经 (2005)
Singapore Dreaming 美满人生 (2006)
Ah Long Pte Ltd 老师嫁老大 (2008)
The Days 歲月 (2008)
Where Got Ghost? 吓到笑 (2009)
Happy Go Lucky 福星到 (2010)
Ah Boys to Men 新兵正传 (2012)
Ah Boys to Men 2 新兵正传2 (2013)
King of Mahjong 麻雀王 (2015)
Ah Boys to Men 3: Frogmen 新兵正传3:蛙人传 (2015)
Zombiepura 屍殺軍營 (2018)

Chinese/Dialect Series

Others
Beauty World: President Star Charity 美世界：总统星光慈善 (1998)

Compilation album

Accolades

References

External links

Richard Loh's MediaCorp TV Celeb Bio
Profile on xin.msn.com

Singaporean people of Hokkien descent
Singaporean people of Chinese descent
Singaporean male film actors
Singaporean Taoists
Singaporean Buddhists
Singaporean television personalities
Singaporean male television actors
Living people
1952 births
20th-century Singaporean male actors
21st-century Singaporean male actors